alffie is an Australian online training company headquartered in Melbourne, Victoria.

It currently provides nationally accredited vocational training in the areas of business, supply chain operations, community services, hospitality, retail services, education support, business to business sales, tourism, cleaning operations and individual supports.

History
Following the 2013 purchase of the online training company Leap eLearning (founded in 2010) by Tasmania-based face-to-face training company HR Company Pty Ltd (founded in 1997) the business then began trading as Leap Training. In 2014, former Australian rules footballer and Westpac executive Paul Licuria was appointed Chief Executive Officer.

On 9 July 2015, HR Company Pty Ltd was taken over by administrators. On 10 July 2015, the Leap Training business was purchased by Training Online Australia Pty Ltd, who as an RTO continued operations under the Leap Training name until October 2015 when it was rebranded alffie.

Courses Available
Certificate III in Cleaning Operations
Certificate III in Education Support
Certificate III in Business to Business Sales
Certificate III in Tourism
Certificate III in Business
Certificate III in Business (Customer Engagement)
Certificate III in Business (Records and Information Management)
Certificate III in Retail
Certificate III in Community Services
Certificate III in Hospitality
Certificate III in Individual Support (Disability)
Certificate III in Individual Support (Ageing)
Certificate III in Individual Support (Home and Community)
Certificate III in Supply Chain Operations

In addition to its accredited courses, the company also offers a number of non-accredited short courses.

See also
Registered training organisation
Vocational education
Australian Qualifications Framework
National Training System (Australia)

References

External links
Official website

Australian vocational education and training providers
Education companies of Australia
Online companies of Australia